Hódmezővásárhely is a district in eastern part of Csongrád County. Hódmezővásárhely is also the name of the town where the district seat is found. The district is located in the Southern Great Plain Statistical Region.

Geography 
Hódmezővásárhely District borders with Szentes District to the north, Orosháza District (Békés County) to the east, Makó District to the south, Szeged District and Kistelek District to the west. The number of the inhabited places in Hódmezővásárhely District is 4.

Municipalities 
The district has 1 urban county, 1 town and 2 villages.
(ordered by population, as of 1 January 2012)

The bolded municipalities are cities.

Demographics

In 2011, it had a population of 56,560 and the population density was 80/km2.

Ethnicity
Besides the Hungarian majority, the main minorities are the Roma (approx. 600) and German (250).

Total population (2011 census): 56,560
Ethnic groups (2011 census): Identified themselves: 50,015 persons:
Hungarians: 48,444 (96.86%)
Gypsies: 571 (1.41%)
Others and indefinable: 1,000 (2.00%)
Approx. 6,500 persons in Hódmezővásárhely District did not declare their ethnic group at the 2011 census.

Religion
Religious adherence in the county according to 2011 census:

Catholic – 13,789 (Roman Catholic – 13,699; Greek Catholic – 88);
Reformed – 8,059;
Evangelical – 369; 
other religions – 1,277; 
Non-religious – 16,606; 
Atheism – 771;
Undeclared – 15,689.

Gallery

See also
List of cities and towns of Hungary

References

External links
 Postal codes of the Hódmezővásárhely District

Districts in Csongrád-Csanád County